is a recreational beach on Lake Inawashiro in Fukushima Prefecture, Japan. On August 18, 1925, Tenjin Beach was the site of the first Boy Scouts of Japan camping trip. Members of the Imperial Family, including Crown Prince Hirohito and Prince Chichibu, attended the event. In winter, strong winds and waves form natural ice sculptures on shoreline vegetation, attracting many amateur photographers to a 1 kilometer stretch of Tenjin Beach.

Kobirakata shrine

, located at Tenjin Beach, is a Tenjin shrine of scholarship, dedicated to the deified Sugawara no Michizane. It is one of three major Tenjin shrines in Japan, the other two being Dazaifu Tenman-gū in Dazaifu, Fukuoka and Kitano Tenman-gū in Kamigyō-ku, Kyoto. It was first built on June 25, 948. According to the Inawashiro Board of Education, in 1682 at the beginning of the Edo period a larger shrine replaced it when the Aizu lord Hoshina Masatsune (保科正経) requested one be built. Doctor Hideyo Noguchi frequented Kobirakata shrine when he lived in Inawashiro.

Notes

References
 Watanabe, Akira (no date): Commemorative plaque at Tenjin Beach, Inawashiro, Fukushima Prefecture, Japan. Viewed on 2007-09-22

External links
 Tenjinhama official website

Beaches of Japan
Scouting in Japan
Landforms of Fukushima Prefecture
Tourist attractions in Fukushima Prefecture